is a 1990 role-playing video game for the Game Boy SETA Corporation. It was never published outside Japan.

Gameplay
Ayakashi no Shiro is a turn-based dungeon crawler. Players move the protagonist through first-person dungeons where randomly occurring battles happen. When combat begins, the player is given several options through a menu system to fight the enemies.

Reception 
Japanese gaming publication Famitsu gave it a score of 21 out of 40.

References

1990 video games
Dungeon crawler video games
Game Boy games
Game Boy-only games
Japan-exclusive video games
Video games about ninja
Role-playing video games
SETA Corporation games
Single-player video games
Tactical role-playing video games
Video games developed in Japan
Video games set in feudal Japan